The Battle of Pieve al Toppo was a battle fought between Arezzo and Siena. The two sides engaged in the battle, and Arezzo was able to take the town. Later on in history, Florence would take over the town, and Arezzo was forced to retake it all over again.

Background 
Arezzo was a powerful city state in Medieval Italy. It wanted control of the Province of Siena, but there were already inhabitants, the people of Siena. And so the only choice was war. An excuse was easy to make; Arezzo was Ghibelline, and Siena was Guelph. The two sides were at war in the Wars of the Guelphs and Ghibellines, and Arezzo was given the absolute right to invade Siena.

Battle 
The aggressors went looking for battle. They found a force of Guelphs awaiting them at the fields of Pieve al Toppo, in Tuscany. The two sides engaged, and Arezzo emerged as the winner of the battle.

Aftermath 
After the Battle of Pieve al Toppo, the victors burnt the town of Civitella in Val di Chiana, wrecking or damaging all of the buildings. In the years in the wake of the battle, the city-state of Florence swept off the Arezzo territories in the Province of Siena, and took over the city in 1289. This was because of the defeat of Arezzo by the Guelphs at the Battle of Campaldino. Arezzo found itself at war with Florence, and the city fell after a short battle in 1311. Pieve al Toppo remained in the hands of Arezzo until 1348, when it became the seat of a Florentine podesta.

1288 in Europe
Pieve al Toppo
Battles involving the Republic of Siena
History of Arezzo
Pieve al Toppo
13th century in the Republic of Siena
1280s in the Holy Roman Empire